The teams competing in Group 1 of the 2011 UEFA European Under-21 Championships qualifying competition were Russia, Romania, Moldova, Latvia, Faroe Islands and Andorra.

Standings

Matches

Goalscorers
There have been 81 goals scored over 30 games, an average of 2.7 goals per game.

1 goal

Own Goals
 Jevgenijs Kazura (for Russia)

1
Qual
Qual